, better known by his stage name , was a Japanese record producer, audio engineer, DJ, composer and arranger best known for his atmospheric instrumental mixes sampling from hip hop, soul, and jazz, as well as incorporating elements of trip hop, breakbeat, downtempo, and ambient music.

Seba released two studio albums during his lifetime: Metaphorical Music (2003) and Modal Soul (2005), while the album Spiritual State was released posthumously in 2011. He was the founder of the independent label Hydeout Productions and released two collection compilations: Hydeout Productions 1st Collection (2003) and 2nd Collection (2007). Additionally, Seba collaborated on the soundtrack for Shinichirō Watanabe's anime series Samurai Champloo (Music Record: Departure and Impression) in 2004.

In 2010, Seba died in a traffic collision at the age of 36. Although relatively niche during his lifetime, Seba has since achieved posthumous acclaim and been referred as the "godfather" of lo-fi hip hop. Seba's production techniques and career have also been compared favorably with J Dilla, who was born on the same day as him.

Biography
Seba was born on February 7, 1974, in the Nishi-Azabu district of Minato in central Tokyo, Japan. In his adulthood, Seba owned a record store in Shibuya, and also founded the independent record label Hydeout Productions.

Career
Seba adopted the stage name Nujabes (his name spelled backwards) and became notable for his approach to producing hip hop beats, often blending jazz influences into his songs creating a mellow, nostalgic and atmospheric sound. He is considered a pioneer of lo-fi hip hop, or "chillhop". Seba collaborated with Japanese artists like Uyama Hiroto, Shing02, L-Universe, and Minmi, and with various underground American hip hop acts such as CYNE, Cise Starr (as a solo apart from the hip-hop collective CYNE), Apani B, Five Deez, Substantial, CL Smooth, Fat Jon, Terry Callier as well as British rapper Funky DL. Seba was also a member of the production duo Urbanforest, an experimental collaboration with Nao T. Seba collaborated with Shing02 on the critically acclaimed Luv(sic) hexalogy, making the parts 1-3 together, but after Seba died unexpectedly many doubted that the series could ever be completed. However, parts 4 and 5 had already been completed, which were released shortly after Seba's death. Part 6 was not among the previously completed tracks, but it was released on February 26, 2013, on the third anniversary of Seba's death. According to Shing02's official Facebook page, the instrumental to what would eventually be part 6 was discovered on Seba's cell phone a few weeks after his death.

Seba was one of the most prolific contributors to the soundtrack of the critically acclaimed anime series Samurai Champloo, which blends a feudal Japanese setting with modern anachronisms, especially in regard to hip hop culture such as graffiti and rapping.

Death
On February 26, 2010, Seba was in a traffic collision upon exiting the Shuto Expressway at 22:14. He was pronounced dead at a hospital in Shibuya Ward after efforts to revive him failed. His grave is located within the Japanese section of Tama Cemetery.

Legacy

Seba's death elicited many tributes from other artists around the world. On Bandcamp, the New York-based Digi Crates records released a series of tribute albums performed by various artists in a style reminiscent of Seba's. Seba's label Hydeout Productions released a tribute album titled Modal Soul Classics II featuring a number of former collaborators and with lyrics and song titles that reference Seba's work.

Frequent collaborator Shing02 remarked, "Through his soulful music, Nujabes has touched so many people around the world, even beyond his dreams", and "[I] deeply regret the loss of a unique talent and a close friend." Shing02 has performed at tribute concerts for Seba.

Daniel Hodgman, founder of hip hop culture website BonusCut, in a 2014 highlight of Modal Soul said that, "Nujabes may not be physically with us anymore, but through his music, his legacy and lust for life lives on." Co-founder Gus Navarro remarked that, "The music of the late producer Nujabes is something to hold onto and never let go."

In 2013, Australian producer Ta-ku released the tribute album 25 Nights for Nujabes.

In 2018, Polish rapper Zeus released the tribute song "Kwiaty dla J."

In 2018, American rapper SahBabii mentioned Nujabes in his song “Anime World”. He said “RIP Nujabes, nine tails a Jinchuriki”. In an interview with XXL, SahBabii said Nujabes was an influence for him to make music.

In 2018, American rapper Logic mentioned Nujabes in the track "Thank You" from his album YSIV, saying "I had to write this over a Nujabes vibe", referencing the production style of the track, which is reminiscent of Nujabes' music. In 2020, Logic cited Nujabes as a key inspiration behind his production style alongside MF Doom, RZA and Kanye West in the track "Perfect" from his album No Pressure.

On 26 July 2019, Otakon held a tribute concert in Washington, D.C., featuring Shing02, MINMI, Substantial, Marcus D and EyeQ.

On October 21, 2020 Chester Watson released the album A Japanese Horror Film featuring a track titled “Nujabes”.

In 2022, videogame Stray featured track Counting Stars as a part of collectible sheet music pages.

Hydeout Productions

Hydeout Productions is an independent record label formerly run by Nujabes.

Artists
 Nujabes (deceased)
 Uyama Hiroto
 Emancipator
 Kenmochi Hidefumi
 Ficus (Cloud Ni9e, Kic. & HISANOVA)
 Nitsua (Zack Austin)
 Feng (FK)
 Funky DL
 L-Universe
 Marcus D
 Pase Rock
 haruka nakamura
 Shing02
 Jemapur
 Substantial
 Cise Starr
 Monorisick (DJ Deckstream) (deceased)

Discography

Studio albums
2003: Metaphorical Music
2005: Modal Soul
2011: Spiritual State

Compilation albums
2003: Hydeout Productions 1st Collection
2007: Hydeout Productions 2nd Collection
2008: Modal Soul Classics
2009: Mellow Beats, Friends & Lovers
2010: Modal Soul Classics II
2014: Free Soul Nujabes First Collection
2014: Free Soul Nujabes Second Collection
2015: Luv(Sic) Hexalogy
2016: Kei Nishikori meets Nujabes

Soundtrack albums
2004: Samurai Champloo Music Record: Departure
2004: Samurai Champloo Music Record: Impression

EPs and singles
1999: Ain't No Mystery
2001: "Dimension Ball Tracks Volume 1"
2002–2013: Luv(sic) Part 1 - Part 6
2002: "Blessing It/The Final View"
2003: "Flower/After Hanabi (Listen To My Beat")
2003: "Next View"
2003: "Lady Brown"
2003: "F.I.L.O"
2003: "Still Talking To You/Steadfast"
2015: Perfect Circle (with Shing02)

Collaborative albums
2001: To This Union a Sun Was Born (with Substantial)
2003: Bullshit as Usual (with Pase Rock)

Official mixtapes
1998: Sweet Sticky Thing
2002: Good Music Cuisine - Ristorante Nujabes
2003: Tribe Sampler Vol. 1

Hydeout Productions discography
 2001: Monorisick (DJ Deckstream) - Hydrothermal Formation
 2002: Nujabes - Good Music Cuisine Ristorante Nujabes
 2003: Nujabes - Hydeout Productions 1st Collection
 2003: Nujabes - Metaphorical Music
 2005: Nujabes - Modal Soul
 2006: Jemapur - Dok Springs
 2005: Nujabes & DJ Ryow A.K.A Smooth Current - Hydeout Sound Lab
 2006: Emancipator - Soon It Will Be Cold Enough (Japanese release only)
 2007: Nujabes - Hydeout Productions 2nd Collection
 2008: Nujabes - Modal Soul Classics
 2008: Uyama Hiroto - A Son of The Sun
 2008: Kenmochi Hidefumi - Falliccia
 2010: Various Artists - Modal Soul Classics II
 2011: Nujabes - Spiritual State
 2013: Haruka Nakamura - Melodica
 2013: Ficus - Black Foliage
 2014: Various Artists - Free Soul Nujabes First Collection
 2014: Various Artists - Free Soul Nujabes Second Collection
 2015: Nujabes feat. Shing02 - Luv(sic) Hexalogy

References

External links
 Hydeout Productions
 

1974 births
2010 deaths
20th-century Japanese male musicians
21st-century Japanese male musicians
Chill-out musicians
Hexalogies
Hip hop record producers
Japanese DJs
Japanese hip hop musicians
Japanese record producers
Musicians from Tokyo
Nu jazz musicians
Road incident deaths in Japan
Trip hop musicians
Lo-fi musicians